The first documented deaths of competitive cyclists during competition or training date to the 1890s and early 1900s when the recently-invented safety bicycle made cycling more popular, both as a sport and as a mode of transport. The athletes listed here were either professional cyclists, professional pacemakers, retired champion cyclists, or well-known competitive amateurs who had a cycling-related death, mostly during a race or during training. Pacemakers are motorcyclists utilized in motor-paced racing, riding motorcycles in front of their cycling teammates to provide additional speed to those cyclists via the resulting slipstream.

Safety has been a concern since cycling's early days. By 1929, at least 47 people had died while racing at velodromes – 33 cyclists and 14 pacemakers. Motor-paced cycling still exists in the modern era as keirin racing and derny racing. A number of professionals and competitive amateurs have been killed in crashes with motorized vehicles while training on public roads plus there is a growing number of cyclists who have died of heart attacks while cycling in a race or while training. Some of these deaths affect cycle racing afterwards – the death of Andrey Kivilev in a crash during the 2003 Paris–Nice race caused the Union Cycliste Internationale to institute a mandatory helmet rule.

The dangers of the various sporting forms of cycling continue to be an issue, including training on public roadways. A survey of 2008 Olympics teams, however, indicated that cycling was not even in the top six most injury-prone sports during competition that year. Racing cyclists who have died during a race or during training are remembered by cycling aficionados and the cycling press. Their personal effects are exhibited in museums, their cemetery markers and tombstones are visited by fans, and as one commentator wrote: "Plaques, statues and shrines to cycling's fallen heroes are scattered all over Europe's mountain roads, turning any ride into a pilgrimage."

Cyclists who died during a race or because of a crash that happened during a race

Cyclists who died during training

The following athletes died while individually training for competitions or during scheduled breaks while participating in a professional race. The only incident of multiple deaths from a team involved Néstor Mora, Augusto Triana, and Hernán Patiño from Team Postobón in 1995. The death rates for cyclists, in general, differ from country to country depending on how popular cycling is. A 2015 study of European Union cyclists' deaths, for instance, showed that in the Netherlands almost 25% of road deaths were cyclists while Greece had less than 5%.

1900 to 1989

1990 to 2000

2001 to 2009

2010 to 2020

2021 to present

See also

 Bicycle racing
 Madonna del Ghisallo
 Ghost bike
 Ride of Silence
 List of doping cases in cycling

Notes

References

External links
 British Pathé film of pacemakers & cyclists during 1946 race at Herne Hill, London on Official British Pathé YouTube channel
 Ride for Silence: "Let the Silence Roar"
 Ride for Silence 1983–2010 In Memoriam
 League of American Cyclists – In Memoriam 2005 to 2009
 What We Learned from Tracking Cycling Deaths for a Year (article), Outside Magazine, January 29, 2021
 This Is Every Cyclist Who Was Killed by a Driver in 2020 (database/presentation), Outside Magazine

Cycling
 
racing cyclists and pacemakers with a cycling-related death
Cycling
cycling
cycling